Flansburgh is a surname. Notable people with the surname include:

Earl Flansburgh (1931–2009), American architect, father of:
John Flansburgh (born 1960), American musician and member of They Might Be Giants
Paxus Calta (born 1957), American political activist, born Earl Schuyler Flansburgh